Daciyan is a town in Jiande, Zhejiang province, China. , it administers Daciyan Residential Community and the following twelve villages:
Daciyan Village
Shangwufang Village
Xinye Village
Li Village
Sanyuan Village
Tan Village
Wushan Village
Liye Village
Shuangquan Village
Chendian Village
Shishan Village
Wangshan Village

References

Towns of Zhejiang
Jiande